Fantawild Adventure Wuhu is a theme park operated by Fantawild (Fangte) in Wuhu, Anhui Province, China. It is the biggest theme park in China with a total area of 125 million square metres. 1.5 billion yuan was invested to build the park.

Zones
The park contains 15 zones:
 Sunshine Plaza
 Fanta Walk
 Fisherman’s Wharf
 Space Journey
 Mystical Valley
 Vesuvius
 Lost Empire
 Elf Valley
 Wild West
 Dino-Peninsula
 Conch Bay
 Duludubi Farm
 Kid’s Zone
 Water Zone
 Flare Meteor

References

External links
 Official website

Tourist attractions in Anhui
Amusement parks in China
Buildings and structures in Wuhu